Valia Venitshaya (December 19, 1899 in Whitechapel, London, England June 26, 1993 in San Jose, California) was a British actress of the silent era.

Selected filmography
 Man and His Kingdom (1922)
 Little Brother of God (1922)
 The Green Caravan (1922)
 The Passionate Friends (1922)
 The Audacious Mr. Squire (1923)
 In the Blood (1923)
 Shifting Sands (1923)
 The Woman Who Obeyed (1923)
 The Starlit Garden (1923)
 A Gamble with Hearts (1923)
 Sally Bishop (1924)
 The Great Prince Shan (1924)

References

External links

1899 births
1993 deaths
Actresses from London
English silent film actresses
20th-century English actresses
British emigrants to the United States